Wiccked is the third studio album by rapper Marvaless, released on August 6, 1996.  It peaked at number 48 on the Billboard Top R&B/Hip-Hop Albums.

Track listing 
 "Ride WIth Me" (featuring Mississippi) — 4:33
 "Wiccked" — 4:46
 "The Zone" — 4:01
 "Sacramento" (featuring Levitti) — 4:11
 "Bring The Bomb" — 3:09
 "Player Shit" (featuring Mac Mall) — 4:01
 "See The Light" (featuring C-Bo) — 3:59
 "Stackin' Riches" (featuring Kollision) — 5:14
 "Ride WIth Me (Remix)" (featuring Mississippi & D-Wiz) — 4:33
 "Fuckin' With Pros" (featuring The Conscious Daughters) — 4:40
 "Killa Kali" — 4:48
 "Sexuality" (featuring Big Lurch & Rick Rock) — 4:36
 "West Coast" (featuring Chereen Briggs) — 4:44

Personnel 
 Kim Collett – Executive Producer
 DJ Daryl – Producer (tracks: 1, 2, 6 to 9, 13)
 Rick Rock – Producer (tracks: 3, 10, 12)
 Ken Lee – Mastering
 D-Wiz – Mixing
 Tony Smith – Photography
 Phunky Phat Graph-X – Artwork, design
 Azikwe Corley – Project Coordinator
 Mike Mosley – Producer
 Skillz – Producer
 Kevin Gardner – Producer

References

External links 
 Wiccked at Discogs
 Wiccked at CD Universe
 Wiccked at iTunes
 Wiccked at Amazon.com

1996 albums
Marvaless albums
Gangsta rap albums by American artists